Ethical marketing refers to the application of marketing ethics into the marketing process. Briefly, marketing ethics refers to the philosophical examination, from a moral standpoint, of particular marketing issues that are matters of moral judgment.  Ethical marketing generally results in a more socially responsible and culturally sensitive business community.  The establishment of marketing ethics has the potential to benefit society as a whole, both in the short- and long-term.  Ethical marketing should be part of business ethics in the sense that marketing forms a significant part of any business model. Study of Ethical marketing should be included in applied ethics and involves examination of whether or not an honest and factual representation of a product or service has been delivered in a framework of cultural and social values.

It promotes qualitative benefits to its customers, which other similar companies, products or services fail to recognise. The concern with ethical issues, such as child labor, working conditions, relationships with third world countries and environmental problems, has changed the attitude of the Western World towards a more socially responsible way of thinking. This has influenced companies and their response is to market their products in a more socially responsible way.

The increasing trend of fair trade is an example of the impact of ethical marketing. In the Ethical Shoppers Price Index Survey (2009), fair trade was the most popular ethical badge products could have. It also revealed that many consumers distrusted green claims. (The idea of fair trade is that consumers pay a guaranteed commodity price to a small group of producers, the producers agree to pay fair labor prices and conserve the environment - a fair deal for everyone.)

The philosophy of marketing is not lost with this newfound ethical slant, but rather hopes to win customer loyalty by reinforcing the positive values of the brand, creating a strong citizen brand. However, this new way of thinking does create new challenges for the marketer of the 21st century, in terms of invention and development of products to add long-term benefits without reducing the product's desirable qualities.

Many brands have tried to use ethics to make themselves look responsible, often spinning environmental claims which has led to the term "greenwash". In research consumers have shown to have even less trust of ethical claims in ads than ordinary ads. media attention on ethics has resulted in many top brands suffering consumer boycotts. Although many brands have tried to use green issues, it has been noted that in research  2/3 of consumers responded more to ethical claims that relate to people rather than to than environment.

Ethical marketing should not be confused with government regulations brought into force to improve consumer welfare, such as reducing sulfur dioxide emissions to improve the quality of the air.  A government regulation is a legal remedy intended to mitigate or correct an ethical issue, such as pollution of the air that we all share.  Enlightened ethical marketing is at work when the company and marketer recognize further improvements for humankind unrelated to those enforced by governments or public opinion. By way of example, the Coop Group refuses to invest money in tobacco, fur and any countries with oppressive regimes.

Over the past few years ethical marketing has become a more important part of marketing with many university courses adding modules on the importance of ethics within the industry, trade bodies such ss the ICC have also added their own courses. 

Many industry awards also now recognise the importance of ethical marketing in the mix.

See also
 Business ethics
 Fair trade
 Greenwashing
 Marketing ethics
 Socially responsible marketing

Further reading
 
 
  
 
 Serafinn, Lynn. (2011). The 7 Graces of Marketing: how to heal humanity and the planet by changing the way we sell. London: Humanity 1 Press.  .

References

External links
  Ethical Marketing for Competitive Advantage on the Internet
 Draft Code of Practice for Ethical Marketing, by the Ethical Marketing Group 
 Ethical Marketing News Resource for those Interested in Ethical Campaigns

Types of marketing
Corporate social responsibility